Zachary Jason Boyer (born October 25, 1971) is a Canadian former National Hockey League right winger.

In the final game of the 1992 Memorial Cup, Boyer scored the championship-winning goal for the Kamloops Blazers with 14 seconds remaining in the third period. The assist came from a young Scott Niedermayer, now a member of the Hockey Hall of Fame.

Drafted by the Blackhawks, Boyer spent two seasons with the Dallas Stars with time split with the IHL Blazers, Indianapolis Ice, Michigan K-Wings, Orlando Solar Bears and Houston Aeros. He played for seven different teams in his hockey career. Boyer played in Europe (SC Herisau, EC Villacher SV, Düsseldorfer EG), but ended his playing career with the Colorado Gold Kings and Orlando Seals.

References

External links

1971 births
Canadian ice hockey right wingers
Chicago Blackhawks draft picks
Colorado Gold Kings players
Dallas Stars players
Düsseldorfer EG players
EC VSV players
Houston Aeros (1994–2013) players
Ice hockey people from the Northwest Territories
Indianapolis Ice players
Kalamazoo Wings (1974–2000) players
Kamloops Blazers players
Living people
Orlando Seals (ACHL) players
Orlando Solar Bears (IHL) players
People from Inuvik
SC Herisau players
St. Albert Saints players
Canadian expatriate ice hockey players in Austria
Canadian expatriate ice hockey players in Germany